Unstable refers to a state of instability.

Unstable may also refer to:

Unstable (album), 2003 album by Adema
"Unstable" (song), first single from the album of the same name
Unstable (Debian), the development distribution of the Debian operating system
Unstable (Magic: The Gathering), a parody expansion of the Magic trading card game

See also
Unsteady (disambiguation)
Stable (disambiguation)